The Women's Amateur Asia-Pacific was founded in 2018 by The R&A and the Asia-Pacific Golf Confederation, to create an event corresponding to The Womens Amateur Championship and U.S. Women's Amateur for Asia, analogous to the Asia-Pacific Amateur Championship for men. It was one of the "elite" tournaments in the World Amateur Golf Ranking.

The winner earns invitations to play in two major championships – the Women's British Open and The Evian Championship, as well as an exemption for the Augusta National Women's Amateur.

Winners

References

External links

Asia-Pacific Golf Confederation

R&A championships
Amateur golf tournaments
Women's golf tournaments
Golf tournaments in Asia
Recurring sporting events established in 2018